The Living Daylights is the soundtrack title for the film The Living Daylights and the eleventh and final Bond soundtrack to be scored by composer John Barry. The soundtrack is notable for its introduction of sequenced electronic rhythm tracks overdubbed with the orchestra – at the time, a relatively new innovation.

The title song of the film, "The Living Daylights", was recorded by Norwegian pop group A-ha. As of 2017 this is the only Bond film where the title song has not been performed by either British or American artists. A-ha and Barry did not collaborate well, resulting in two versions of the theme song. Barry's film mix is heard on the soundtrack and all three of A-ha's best-of compilations. The A-ha preferred mix can be heard on their 1988 album Stay on These Roads. However, in 2006 A-ha's Paul Waaktaar-Savoy complimented Barry's contributions "I loved the stuff he added to the track, I mean it gave it this really cool string arrangement. That's when, for me, it started to sound like a Bond thing".

Originally, British pop duo Pet Shop Boys was asked to compose the soundtrack, but backed out when they learned that they should not provide a complete soundtrack but merely the opening theme song.

In a departure from conventions of previous Bond films, the film uses different songs over the opening and end credits. The song heard over the end credits, "If There Was a Man" - which acts as the film's "love theme" - was one of two songs performed for the film by the Pretenders (led by lyricist/lead vocalist Chrissie Hynde).  The other song, "Where Has Everybody Gone", is heard as source music in the film (from Necros's Walkman). The Pretenders were originally considered to perform the film's title song. However, the producers had been pleased with the commercial success of Duran Duran's "A View to a Kill", and felt that A-ha would be more likely to make an impact in the charts. In the event, "The Living Daylights" was a hit in many countries.

The original soundtrack released by Warner Bros. Records featured only 12 tracks. Later re-releases by Rykodisc and EMI added nine additional tracks, including an alternate instrumental end credits.

Leitmotifs 

Composer John Barry utilises eight leitmotifs on the soundtrack, that recurs in two or more of the tracks listed. Two of them are pinned to location, three are pinned to characters Necros, Kara and Koskov, one is pinned to the title song by A-ha, one is pinned to the Mujahedin and one is the Monty Norman James Bond Theme.

The Living Daylights Theme

 1. "The Living Daylights"
 9. "Hercules Takes Off"
 15. "Murder at the Fair" (1:14–1:37)
 16. ""Assassin" and Drugged" (0:34–1:25)

Necros' Theme

 2. "Necros Attacks"
 7. "Where Has Everybody Gone"
 11. "Inflight Fight"
 15. "Murder at the Fair" (0:12–1:13)
 16. ""Assassin" and Drugged" (0:00–0:13)
 18. "Afghanistan Plan" (0:33–0:42, 1:20–1:36, 2:07–2:23)

Mujahedin Theme

 3. "The Sniper Was a Woman" (1:10–2:30)
 10. "Mujahadin and Opium"
 17. "Airbase Jailbreak" (1:35–4:38)

James Bond Theme

 4. "Ice Chase"
 6. "Koskov Escapes" (1:36-2:12)
 13. "Exercise at Gibraltar" (0:00–0:22, 1:44–1:51, 2:59–5:43)
 20. "Final Confrontation" (0:00–0:30)

Kara's Theme

 5. "Kara Meets Bond"
 14. "Approaching Kara" (0:00–1:23)

Koskov's Theme

 6. "Koskov Escapes" (0:48–1:16)
 17. "Airbase Jailbreak" (0:00–0:34)

Vienna Theme / If There Was a Man

 8. "Into Vienna"
 12. "If There Was a Man"
 14. "Approaching Kara" (1:23–2:22)
 21. "Alternate End Titles"

Afghanistan Theme

 13. "Exercise at Gibraltar" (2:00–2:18)
 16. ""Assassin" and Drugged" (0:00–0:18)
 17. "Airbase Jailbreak" (0:34–1:35)

Track listing 
 "The Living Daylights" – A-ha
 "Necros Attacks"
 "The Sniper Was a Woman"
 "Ice Chase"
 "Kara Meets Bond"
 "Koskov Escapes"
 "Where Has Everybody Gone" – The Pretenders
 "Into Vienna"
 "Hercules Takes Off"
 "Mujahadin and Opium"
 "Inflight Fight"
 "If There Was a Man" – The Pretenders
 "Exercise at Gibraltar" 
 "Approaching Kara"
 "Murder at the Fair"
 ""Assassin" and Drugged"
 "Airbase Jailbreak"
 "Afghanistan Plan"
 "Air Bond"
 "Final Confrontation"
 "Alternate End Titles"

In addition to the above, the film features a number of pieces of classical music – naturally, since it involves an international-standard cellist in Kara Milovy. Mozart's 40th Symphony in G minor (1st movement only; the concert's interval oddly comes after this movement and not the finale) is being performed by the orchestra at the Conservatoire in Bratislava when Koskov defects. As Moneypenny relates to Bond, Kara is next to perform Borodin's String Quartet in D major – 007 joins a small audience and tells Kara afterwards that her performance was "exquisite". Dvořák's cello concerto in B minor and Mozart's Le nozze di Figaro (in Vienna) also feature. At the end of the film, Kara performs Tchaikovsky's Rococo Variations before a rapturous audience including M, General Gogol (but not Kamran Shah, who arrives too late) and Bond – though she does not know it until he surprises her in her dressing room afterwards.

See also 
 Outline of James Bond

References 

John Barry (composer) soundtracks
Soundtrack
Soundtrack albums from James Bond films
1987 soundtrack albums